Kageras is a late medieval era fort in Sudan. Located in Upper Nubia, it lies on the eastern side of the Nile, about half way between the third and second cataract. During the tenth or eleventh century, a church was built here. A defensive wall was added in the late Middle Ages. On every corner, there are round towers. In the north, there is an entrance. It appears to be more like a refuge for Christian from attacking nomads. A 1966-1969 American - Swiss expedition examined the site.

References

 Ch.Maystre: "Fouilles américano-suisses aux églises de Kageras, Ukma Est et Sonqi Sud", in Kunst und Geschichte Nubiens in christlicher Zeit, E. Dinkler (ed.), Recklinghausen 1970, S. 181-208 (German language)

Archaeological sites in Sudan
Nubian architecture in Sudan